Eulithidium beaui is a species of small sea snail with calcareous opercula, a marine gastropod mollusk in the family Phasianellidae, the pheasant snails.

Description
The shell grows to a height of 7.5 mm.

Distribution
This marine species occurs off Antigua, Martinique, Barbados and Trinidad & Tobago

References

External links
 To Encyclopedia of Life
 To World Register of Marine Species

Phasianellidae
Gastropods described in 1958